Lodge Night is the 15th Our Gang short subject comedy released. The Our Gang series (later known as "The Little Rascals") was created by Hal Roach in 1922, and continued production until 1944.

Synopsis
Joe arrives as the new boy in school, and the boys decide to initiate him into their secret club, the Cluck Cluck Klams. During the proceedings, a couple of auto thieves break into the barn, and when they make their getaway, Farina and Jackie are in the back seat.

Notes
When the television rights for the original silent Pathé Our Gang comedies were sold to National Telepix and other distributors, several episodes were retitled. This film was re-released as Mischief Makers in 1960 under the title The Secret Meeting. About two-thirds of the original film was included. Deleted scenes from this print include some of the classroom footage from the beginning of the film, as well as all of the scenes showing Ernie and Farina at Prof. Culpepper's night school. The film was also re-released as Those Lovable Scallawags with Their Gangs under the title Their Latest Prank.

Cast

The Gang
 Joe Cobb — Joe
 Jackie Condon — Jackie
 Mickey Daniels — Mickey
 Jack Davis — Jack
 Allen Hoskins — Farina
 Mary Kornman — Mary
 Ernest Morrison — Ernie
 Elmo Billings — Elmo
 Andy Samuel — Andy
 Richard Billings — Richard 
 George Warde — Freckles

Additional cast
 Julia Brown — school girl
 Ivadell Carter — school girl
 Mary Murphy — school girl
 Richard Daniels — Mickey and Jackie's father
 Fanny Kelly — Mickey and Jackie's mother
 Ernie Morrison Sr. — Prof. T. Jefferson Culpepper
 Charles Stevenson — car thief
 Roy Brooks — car thief

See also
 Our Gang filmography

References

External links
 
 

1923 films
1923 comedy films
Hal Roach Studios short films
American silent short films
American black-and-white films
Films directed by Robert F. McGowan
Our Gang films
1923 short films
1920s American films
Silent American comedy films